Omorgus varicosus is a species of hide beetle in the subfamily Omorginae and subgenus Afromorgus.

References

varicosus
Beetles described in 1843